Jatropha gossypiifolia, commonly known as bellyache bush, black physicnut or cotton-leaf physicnut, is a species of flowering plant in the spurge family, Euphorbiaceae. The species is native to Mexico, South America, and the Caribbean islands, but is currently spread throughout the tropics. It is declared noxious weed in Puerto Rico and is naturalised in northern Australia, including Queensland where it is listed as a Class 2 declared pest plant. The three lobed leaves are purple and sticky when young and become bright green with age. The small red flowers with yellow centres appear in clusters. These are followed by cherry-sized seed pods that are poisonous. Powdery mildew fungal disease was reported.

There are many common names for Jatropha gossypiifolia including: bellyache-bush, black physicnut, and cotton-leaf physicnut in English; pinon negro, pinon colorado, and tua-tua in Spanish; medicinier noir and medicinier rouge in French; mamoninha and peao-roxo in Brazil; jarak ulung in Thailand, jarak merah and sibidigua in India.

Меdicinal use
Several human and veterinary uses in traditional medicine are described for different parts (leaves, stems, roots, seeds, and latex) and preparations (infusion, decoction, and maceration, among others) based on this plant, by different routes (oral or topical). The most frequent reports concern its antihypertensive, anti-inflammatory, antiophidian, analgesic, antipyretic, antimicrobial, healing, antianemic, antidiabetic, and antihemorrhagic activities, among many other examples. Other uses are also related to this plant, such as biodiesel production, pesticide, insecticide, vermifuge, ornamentation, and even its use in religious rituals.

'The American Instructor,' a reference book written by Benjamin  Franklin, states it can be used as an abortion tonic, along with pennyroyal:
 

The herb has been traditionally used as an oral contraceptive and abortifacient, and ethanol extracts have effectiveness in reducing fertility in rats. though the identity of the chemicals responsible for endocrine disruption are not yet known.

Economic importance
 Vertebrate poisons: mammals
 Weed: potential seed contaminant

Image gallery

References

External links
 

gossypiifolia
Flora of the Caribbean
Flora of Mexico
Flora of South America
Flora of Saint Kitts and Nevis
Plants described in 1753
Taxa named by Carl Linnaeus
Flora without expected TNC conservation status